Gymnastic Club Iraklis Thessaloniki Football Club is a Greek professional football club based in the city of Thessaloniki, Macedonia, Greece. As of 2022, the club competes in the Super League Greece 2. It plays its home matches at Kaftanzoglio Stadium.

Founded in 1908 as "Macedonikos Gymnasticos Syllogos" (Macedonian Gymnastics Club), they are one of the oldest in Greek football and the oldest in Thessaloniki, hence the nickname Ghireos (meaning the Elder). A year later, the name "Iraklis" (Heracles) was added to the club's name as an honour to the ancient Greek hero Heracles (or Hercules as the Roman equivalent). The team's colours are cyan or blue and white, inspired by the Greek flag. Iraklis is a founding member of Macedonia Football Clubs Association, as well as the Hellenic Football Federation, as a part of G.S. Iraklis.

Before the formation of the nationwide league of Alpha Ethniki, Iraklis competed in the league that was run by the Macedonia Football Clubs Association, winning it on no less than five occasions. The club has also played in five Greek Cup finals, lifting the trophy once in the 1976 final, which is the club's only domestic trophy. They have also an international title, as they won the Balkans Cup in 1985.

History

Foundation and first years (1899–1914)

Iraklis traced its roots back in 1899 when Omilos Filomouson (meaning Friends of Music Club) was established. The club was established as a cultural union of the Greeks of Thessaloniki, but in 1902 it founded a sports department. Football was a new sport at the time, but rapidly increasing in popularity and thus the board of directors decided to line up a football team. The first match that was held by the Omilos Filomouson football team was on 23 April 1905, against a team of the Western European diaspora of the city called Union Sportive. Omilos Filomouson won the match by a 3–0 scoreline. Later on, the club faced financial problems, but members of the club joined forces with another Greek athletic club of the city, called Olympia. The result of this union was the foundation of a new club on 29 November 1908, called Makedonikos Gymnastikos Syllogos (meaning Macedonian Gymnastics Club), that gained a permission to operate by the Ottoman authorities. The new club's first president was a Greek doctor, Alkiviadis Maltos. The name of the club had a direct reference to the ethnic tensions that took place in the area at that time. Due to the Young Turks' revolt of 1908 and their promises for ease of ethnic tensions in the area, the club was forced to change its name. Thus a new name was decided for the club, Ottomanikos Ellinikos Gymnastikos Syllogos Thessalonikis "Iraklis" (meaning Ottoman Greek Gymnastics Club of Thessaloniki "Iraklis"). The new name was approved, together with a new statute and a new board of directors, by a general assembly of the club on 13 April 1911. After the integration of Thessaloniki in the Kingdom of Greece, the operation of the club was accepted by the Greek courts in 1914 and on 11 January 1915 Iraklis became a fully registered sports club.

National establishment and early success (1914–1959)
Shortly after the end of the Second Balkan War, Iraklis together with the three Jewish football clubs of the city, Progrès Sportive, Alliance and French-German School Alumni Union organised the first Thessaloniki Football Championship in January and February 1914. Iraklis won Alliance 3–1, Progrès Sportive 5–1 and after winning the French-German School Alumni Union, the club was proclaimed Champion of Thessaloniki. On 6 April 1914, Iraklis played a match against Athinaikos Syllogos Podosfairou, that ended as a draw. It was the club's first match against a club outside Thessaloniki. In 1914, Iraklis established the club's youth squad, so the students of the Greek Gymnasium of the city could train in football. A year later Iraklis won the second Thessaloniki Football Championship. The next championship was not held due to World War I.

In the years following World War I, several football clubs were established in Thessaloniki and that led to the establishment of the Macedonia Football Clubs Association in 1923. The first championship from the newly founded association was organised shortly afterwards and Iraklis lost in the tournament's final 4–1 from Aris. In 1924 Iraklis played its first match against a club from outside the borders of Greece. It was a match against Yugoslav club SSK Skopje, a contest that ended 2–1 in favour of Iraklis. It was in that same year that Iraklis played its first match abroad, a 3–0 friendly win against SK Bitola. In 1926 the club appointed Hungarian Joseph Sveg as manager, the first ever foreign manager in Greece. Under Sveg's guidance, Iraklis won the Championship organised by the Macedonia Football Clubs Association in 1926–27. By winning 6–0 against the reigning champion of West Macedonia Ermis Shorovich and the champion of East Macedonia and Thrace Rodopi, Iraklis was proclaimed Champion of Macedonia and Thrace. In the following years, Iraklis did not have any success finishing in runner up and even lower positions in the Macedonia Football Clubs Association Championship.

In the 1933–34 season Iraklis won the Northern Group of the National Championship qualifying for the championship final, where the club had to compete against the champion of the Southern group Olympiacos. The first leg was played in Iraklis Ground on 10 June 1934. Although Iraklis took a 2–0 lead at half time, Olympiacos managed to make a comeback in the second half, winning the game by a 2–3 scoreline. The second leg was played a week later in Piraeus and Olympiacos was proclaimed National champion by winning this match 2–1. In the following years Iraklis faced mid table mediocrity, with the exception of the 1936–37 season, when the club was only one point short to Macedonia Football Clubs Association champions PAOK. The 1938–39 season was a successful one for Iraklis, as it won both the Macedonia Football Clubs Association championship and the Northern Group of the National Championship, the second resulting in the qualification of Iraklis in the National final. In the national final Iraklis lost to AEK both away and at home (1–3 and 2–4 respectively), failing to win the silverware. In the following season Iraklis celebrated its consecutive win in the Macedonia Football Clubs Association Championship but failed to qualify for the National final.

All club football in Greece was suspended from 1941 to 1945 due to the German occupation of the country. After the war period, the club was constantly competing with Aris for the Thessaloniki championship, which gave upon its winner the right to participate in the Greek championship. Iraklis participated in the 1947 Greek Cup final, where was defeated 5–0 by the dominant Greek team of that era, Olympiacos. In the 1950s, the team solidified its position among the top teams in Greece along with Olympiacos, AEK Athens, Panathinaikos, Aris and PAOK. Nevertheless, the club struggled with financial difficulties in an ailing Greek economy. Thessaloniki (where many refugees from the Greco-Turkish War of 1919–1922 had settled) was particularly damaged by the economic downturn. The highlight of the decade was the 1957 Greek Cup final, in which Iraklis was once again defeated by Olympiacos, 2–0.

Semi-professional Alpha Ethniki era (1959–1975)
Iraklis played in the inaugural season of A' Ethniki. The club secured the 10th position in the first season of national top tier of Greece. Iraklis football academy was founded during the same season after the suggestion of club manager Panos Markovic. In the 1960–61 season Iraklis finished 8th and achieved a record 4–0 win against Atromitos Piraeus. The club also reached the Greek Cup semi-finals that season, getting eliminated by Panionios. The following two seasons Iraklis played in the Inter-Cities Fairs Cup, getting eliminated both times, by FK Vojvodina and Real Zaragoza respectively. In the league, Iraklis secured the 6th position for the 1961–62 season, a club record at the time. The rest of the 1960s, Iraklis secured mid-table positions repeating the club record in the 1969–70 season. In 1965, Kostas Aidiniou, a player that together with fellow Greek international Zacharias Chaliabalias would lead the club for the following decade, debuted for Iraklis. During the 1968–69 season Iraklis matched its record win as it won AEL Limassol by a 4–0 margin.

In the 1970–71 season Iraklis, under the guidance of Yugoslav manager Ljubiša Spajić, finished 5th in the league, the club's best positioning since the establishment of Alpha Ethniki. In that season, Iraklis sold 45,634 tickets in a 1–0 home win against Panathinaikos, a club record since today and an Alpha Ethniki record at the time. The following for seasons, Iraklis achieved safe mid-table positions. In 1972, Iraklis signed Dimitris Gesios from Kozani, a player that would become the club's all-time league top-scorer. In the 1973–74 season Iraklis broke its biggest win record in Alpha Ethniki, by beating AEL 6–1. On 29 August 1974, Iraklis sold its star player Aidiniou to Olympiacos for 11,000,000 drachmas. In the next season Iraklis beat Kalamata 5–0 at home to match its record win and finished 8th in the league. The club also reached the semi-final of that season's Cup. Iraklis was eliminated 1–2 by Panathinaikos at home. After the match, three players of Iraklis, Chaliabalias, Rokidis and Nikoloudis revealed that there was an attempt from Panathinaikos officials to bribe them for the semi-final. The two first were driven out of the club while the latter was sent off the club for six months.

The Absolute Star: Vassilis Hatzipanagis era (1975–1990) 
On 22 November 1975, the club acquired Vassilis Hatzipanagis, a USSR national of Greek descent, who was late voted a Greece's Golden player for UEFA Jubilee Awards. In the 1975–76 Greek Cup competition Iraklis eliminated Veria, Pierikos, Trikala and Panetolikos to reach the semi-finals. In the semi-finals Iraklis beat Panathinaikos 3–2, at home. Panathinaikos appealed against the result claiming the Iraklis' winning goal came from an offside position. Finally the courts turned down Panathinaikos' appeal and Iraklis qualified to the final to face Olympiacos. On 9 June 1976 Iraklis won the Cup after a 6–5 penalty shootout. In the final Hatzipanagis scored twice, Kousoulakis and Gesios scored once each, in a match that ended 2–2 in full-time and 4–4 in extra-time. In the league Iraklis finished in the 8th position led by Gesios and Hatzipanagis, that scored 9 and 6 goals respectively. In the next season Iraklis was eliminated from Cypriot club APOEL in the Cup Winners' Cup and struggled in the league finishing in the 12th position, gathering just one point more from relegated Panetolikos. Iraklis improved slightly in the next season ending up ninth in the league with Gesios achieving a personal best scoring 13 goals. The 1978–1979 season the club improved greatly under the guidance of Antoni Brzeżańczyk. Iraklis finished sixth in the league, had a positive goal aggregate for the first time since the 1973–74 season and achieved the club's biggest victory in Alpha Ethniki by beating Rodos by an 8–1 margin.

The 1979–80 season was the first season of fully professional football in Greece. Iraklis finished in the 8th position in the league having his best goal difference since the establishment of Alpha Ethniki with +11. The highlight of the season was a 6–0 against title perennial contenders Panathinaikos, which is Panathinaikos' biggest league defeat to date. In the Greek Cup competition of the season Iraklis eliminated Veria, Niki Volos, Almopos Aridaea and Panarkadikos to reach the semi-finals. In the semi-finals Iraklis eliminated PAOK, but the club's chairman was accused for a bribe attempt by PAOK's player Filotas Pellios. Iraklis proceeded to play in the Cup final, but as the players' morale was damaged the club was defeated by underdogs Kastoria by a 5–2 margin. At the end of the season Iraklis was demoted to the Beta Ethniki, due to the alleged bribery scandal. Iraklis appealed against that decision, and the club was, later on, declared not guilty, but the club already played in the Second Division. In the 1980–81 season Iraklis had to compete in the Beta Ethniki without his star player Vasilis Hatzipanagis. The club won the championship in the Northern Group with Ilias Chatzieleftheriou being the top scorer with 24 goals. Iraklis scored a total of 99 goals, conceding 22, and achieved a club league record 12–0 win against Edessaikos. Upon its return to the top tier Iraklis managed to finish in the 6th position in the league and achieved the club's best goal difference at the time with +14. In 1983–84 Iraklis finished in third place overall, which remains to date the club's best positioning, since professional football was established in 1959. The club, led by Hatzipanagis that scored 12 goals in the season, also had its best goal difference since the establishment of Alpha Ethniki with +27 goals and its best defence record, conceding only 20 goals.

In the 1984–85 season Iraklis finished in the 5th position setting the club's offensive record scoring 59 goals. Major contributors to this record were Hatzipanagis, Lakis Papaioannou and Sigurður Grétarsson each contributing 10 goals throughout the campaign. In the same season Iraklis won its only international competition, the Balkans Cup. Iraklis had to eliminate Turkish giants Galatasaray by winning 5–2 on aggregate in the quarter-finals, and Ankaragücü through a penalty shoot-out in the semi-finals. In the final's second leg Iraklis won Argeș Pitești 4–1, thus winning the trophy 5–4 on aggregate. In the 1985–86 season Iraklis, led by Lakis Papaioannou that finished the season with 8 goals, finished in the fourth position, having the best defensive record in the league, conceding 22 goals. Two years later, 17,000 fans travelled to Athens to support Iraklis in the 1987 Greek Cup final, unfortunately to see their team lose 3–1 on penalties (1–1 regular time) to OFI Crete. On 9 November 1990, shortly after an UEFA Cup match against Valencia, Hatzipanagis announced his retirement from professional football.

Reconstruction and change of ownership (1990–2007)
The 1990s were a period of reconstruction for the club, as aging players either left the club or retired. Hatzipanagis' retirement in 1990 had a major negative impact on the team's success. Fans began calling for a change in the club's management, as club president Petros Theodoridis began selling the team's most talented players (Christos Kostis, Giorgos Anatolakis, Savvas Kofidis etc.). Iraklis competed in 1990 against Valencia in the UEFA Cup, being eliminated in overtime at Mestalla.

Evangelos Mytilineos period (2000–2004)

The team was sold in 2000 to prominent Greek businessman Evangelos Mytilineos for almost €3,500,000 (1.18 billion drachmas). Despite the acquisition of many promising players during the first summer, the 2000–2001 campaign didn't have the expected results, with the club finishing in 5th position, out of European qualification spots. However, Iraklis managed to progress to the 2nd round of UEFA Cup, where they achieved a memorable (although without any effect) win over 1. FC Kaiserslautern in Fritz-Walter-Stadion. Next summer, Mytilineos's first move was to sell the highly rated striker and fans' favorite Michalis Konstantinou to Panathinaikos, setting a new record for the highest fee received for a domestic transfer. That move worsened the relationship between the new owner and the fans, while it clearly weakened the club, since Konstantinou was not replaced. Manager Giannis Kyrastas, who was widely considered one of Greece's bests, was replaced by previous coach Angelos Anastasiadis who in his second tenure managed to qualified once again for the UEFA Cup on a very small budget. In 2004, Mytilineos announced his desire to leave the team and therefore sell it to Giorgos Spanoudakis (a friend of his from their school years, who used to be first vice-president of the club), for just €1, since the team was heavily in debt. Spanoudakis initiated a series of expensive but unsuccessful deals like Polish international Cezary Kucharski and Serie A veteran Giuseppe Signori, driving the team close to bankruptcy. He later tried to get rid of the team by selling it to yet another unknown businessman named Dimitris Houlis, who had been a president of Akratitos F.C. After a 5-month period during which Houlis controlled the team, the Greek football commission finally annulled the transfer, raising questions in the media regarding its handling of the previous one between Mytilinaios and Spanoudakis, too.

In January 2004, Savvas Kofidis, famous as a player of the team in the 1980s, became the team's manager. During the 2005–06, he led Iraklis to an acclaimed 4th-place finish, playing effective and attractive football, creating a club record for 13 consecutive wins at home. However, with considerable debts to players, coaches and the state, Spanoudakis started the 2006–07 season attempting to reconcile Iraklis finances by selling Joël Epalle and Panagiotis Lagos, who were instrumental in the previous year's success. Next year Kofidis resigned as manager of a considerably weakened team after Iraklis lost 7 and drew 2 of his first nine games in Greek Super League and additionally was eliminated from the UEFA Cup in extra time by Wisła Kraków. Eventually the 2006–07 season ended in a hard breaking fashion as the team gained its survival to Greek Super League only in the last matchday, after breaking a 39 matches unbeaten home run of Skoda Xanthi.

Financial collapse and relegations (2007–2011)
On 13 July 2007, Spanoudakis eventually resigned and the team passed to the hands of a consortium of local businessmen, with prominent Greek singer Antonis Remos (a lifelong fan of the team) as their leader. The new owners tried to stabilize the team financially having already paid the debts to Giuseppe Signori (almost 1,000,000 $) and to other players and lenders from the past.
 
However, on 4 May 2011 Iraklis was relegated back to Football League (Greece) after failing to obtain a license to participate in 2011–12 Super League. On 19 May 2011, the Disciplinary Committee of the competition found Iraklis guilty of forgery during the winter transfer window. Therefore, the club was automatically placed in the last position. That is a unique case as Iraklis has never finished in a relegation spot but has been relegated twice. Moreover, on 26 September the Professional Sports Committee stripped Iraklis from its professional licence and demoted it to Delta Ethniki. This situation spurred reactions from Iraklis fans, with demonstrations in Thessaloniki and Athens.

Resurgence through Pontioi Katerini (2011–2014)

The team finally competed in the 2011–12 Delta Ethniki, which started late due to Koriopolis, without much success. Meanwhile, the club's board was discussing a possible merger with another club. There were discussions with local teams Agrotikos Asteras and Anagennisi Epanomi, but only the ones with Pontioi were successful, and a pre-agreement contract was signed between Iraklis and Pontioi on 3 January 2012. The resulting team was named AEP Iraklis F.C., but virtually Iraklis replaced Pontioi Katerinis, who ceased to exist. On 20 January 2012, the merger was approved by amateur Iraklis, and their football team was disbanded and withdrawn from the Delta Ethniki.

The merged club
On 3 January 2012, the two teams reached an agreement regarding the running of the new club, with further negotiations planned after six months. Pontioi Katerinis would change their name to AEP Iraklis, take the badge and colors of Iraklis, and move to Kaftanzoglio Stadium. The squad would consist of players from both teams and be trained in Katerini.

On 23 January 2012, the team played their first game at home against Tilikratis, while pending approval of the merger by the Greek Professional Sports Committee.

Ιn August 2012, AEP Iraklis was incorporated as AEP Iraklis 1908 FC. The new merged club has no legal connection to the original Iraklis Thessaloniki F.C., but is essentially considered as a direct continuation of it, as it uses the crest of Iraklis Thessaloniki FC, its colours, and incorporates players and people associated with the former Iraklis FC. Therefore, G.S. Iraklis Thessaloniki has no shares of the new company, but instead still holds the 10% of the bankrupt original Iraklis FC company, which remains to be dissolved.

On 24 September 2012, the merged club was accepted in Greek Football League, as an acknowledgement of injustice against the old PAE Iraklis. In 2014 the company was renamed in PAE Iraklis 1908.

In the summer of 2014, and after several months of negotiations, Spyros Papathanasakis became the new major shareholder of the club.

Relegation (2017)
Iraklis was dissolved as a professional club in 2017, due to major financial issues the club had been facing for some years. They failed to participate in Football League (second tier) and were thus dissolved as a professional football club and begun the season in division 3 (Gamma Ethniki). The next season they promoted back.

Relegation (2019) and new successor club
Iraklis was relegated in 2019 from the professional second-tier Football League into the amateur fourth-tier Gamma Ethniki, due to the restructuring of the Greek national championships and its performance in conjunction to its financial state. This led the professional club into further insolvency and an inability to form a squad to participate in any championship in the 2019–20 season. Faced with this situation, a new football club, named Iraklis 2015 was formed through the volleyball club of the Iraklis sports club family, which started participating in the lowest regional championship of the Thessaloniki region, the Macedonia Football Clubs Association Gamma Amateur Championship, which is on the fourth tier regionally and on the eighth nationally.
On 20 April 2020, amateur championships were suspended due to the COVID-19 pandemic, therefore Iraklis won the championship winning all 15 games, scoring 88 goals and conceding 6. In July 2021, an agreement between the club and Triglia was announced and Iraklis will officially be in Super League 2 for the 2021–22 season.

Crest and colours

Iraklis's crest has changed through times. The original club logo was a capital Η (Eta), the first letter of the word Iraklis (Ηρακλής) in Greek, surrounded by a circle. After the 2000 takeover of the club by Evangelos Mytilinaios, the logo was changed once again to a more "modern" looking one.  During the 2008–09 season the club used a special logo, created especially for its centenary. The crest that is now used depicts the demigod Heracles resting upon his club, a scene inspired by Farnese Hercules statue, itself a copy of a statue crafted by Lysippos in the fourth century BC.

Throughout the entire club's history its colours were blue or cyan and white, to resemble the colours of the Greek flag, given the fact that Iraklis was established while Thessaloniki was a part of the Ottoman Empire. The team is so known in Greece as Kianolefkoi (Greek: "Κυανόλευκοι"), meaning the Cyan-Whites. Iraklis' away colours were usually either white or orange. Traditionally, the Iraklis shirt was blue and white stripes, but through the years this was changed often to all blue, all white, chess-like, and hooped, among others.

Kit evolution
First

Alternative

Sponsorships:
Great Shirt Sponsor: N/A
Official Sport Clothing Manufacturer: Givova
Official Sponsor: N/A

Facilities

Stadium

The first ground of the team was placed in the centre of Thessaloniki, nearby the White Tower. Its construction was funded by the members of G.S. Iraklis, but, after Thessaloniki became a part of Greece, the club was ousted from its owned ground, so a park could be created in its place. In 1915, Iraklis rented an area in the centre of Thessaloniki for a ten years period, but the club was unable to use its facilities until 1919, due to World War I. In 1927 the club renewed the contract for the use of the area, but in 1930, the newly founded Aristotle University of Thessaloniki tried to take the ownership of the field. For almost two decades the ground was used by both the athletes of Iraklis and the students of the university, until in the 1950s the university managed to get the ownership of the ground, so it could demolish it to construct a square, that is nowadays known as Platia Chimiou.

On 6 November 1960 Iraklis played its first match in Kaftanzoglio Stadium, to record a 2–1 win against M.G.S.S. Thermaikos Thessalonikis. Kaftanzoglio has been the home ground of Iraklis ever since, including the 2011–12 season, when both the G.S. Iraklis and the A.E.P. Iraklis team used it as their home ground. In the 2002–03 and 2003–04 seasons Iraklis used Makedonikos Stadium as its home ground. That decision was made due to the renovation of Kaftanzoglio for the 2004 Summer Olympics. Iraklis also owns a football ground and training facilities in the, adjacent to Kaftanzoglio Stadium, Chortatzides area, where the juveniles of the club train. There were plans for Iraklis to construct a new 22,000-seat stadium, in a club owned area in the eastern extremities of the city, in Mikra.

Training facility
Iraklis Sports Center locates in the area of Mikra and is the club-owned training ground of the team. The training facilities include three football fields, gym, sauna, water pool, such as the administration building of Iraklis FC. In the area, the club's new stadium also was planned to be built.

Supporters

Iraklis was well supported right from the start of its establishment. Even though the football section wasn't the most popular among club loyals in the very first years, it soon became the "flagship" of the sports club, as football became more and more popular. In the '70s and '80s, the club attracted crowds of around 10.000 people, to reach a peak in the 1983–84 season with an average attendance of 16,559. In the '90s, following Hatzipanagis' retirement and the general fall in attendances in Greek football, crowds in Kaftanzoglio deteriorated to a modest average of 5,000. A record low attendance was recorded during the '90s, as in a match against Paniliakos there were only 384 tickets sold. A brief increase in attendance was recorded after the purchase of the club by Evangelos Mytilineos, reaching a peak in the 2001–02 season with an average of 6,790. On 24 January 1971 Iraklis set the highest attendance record for any football match in Alpha Ethniki, with 45,634 tickets sold in the club's contest against Panathinaikos. In the 1987 Greek Cup final a crowd of 17,000 Iraklis fans travelled to Athens, to watch Iraklis lose in penalties against OFI. In two recent opinion polls Iraklis was ranked as the 6th most popular football club in Greece, gathering 2.8%–3.7% of the participating football supporters.

The most prominent supporters' club of the team is Aftonomi Thira 10 (meaning Autonomous Gate 10), a fan club with a total of 15 branches in Northern Greece. The fan club is known for holding an antiracist stance, as it participates in the Ultras Antiracist Festival. Other activities of the fan club include the publication of a magazine and the conduct of an annual festival. Other minor supporters' clubs are SFISE, Blue Boys, A.P.A.T.S.I. and Iraklis Fan Club of Athens.

Iraklis' supporters hold ties with the supporters of FSV Mainz, Rayo Vallecano, Zemun and FK Buducnost Podgorica as those have shown their support during Iraklis' supporters rallies against Super League's refusal to grant Iraklis a license to participate in the 2010–11 Super League season.

Also, the fans have sympathy for all the clubs named "Heracles" worldwide, most notably the Spanish Hércules CF. Since 2003, fans of both teams formed a friendship through the internet. There is even a Hércules CF supporters club that bears the name "Iraklis", in honor of their friendship.

Ownership and financing

Professional era
Until 1979 Greek football was semi-professional and each football club was run by a board and a president appointed by its respective multi-sport club, of which it was considered a branch. In the 1979–80 season the football branch of Iraklis became an SA owned by local businessmen Tertilinis and Pertsinidis. In the 1983–84 season Iraklis was bought by Petros Theodorides who remained at the helm of the club for almost 18 years. From the beginning of the 1999–2000 season there were demonstrations by the supporters of Iraklis, asking for the resignation of Theodoridis from his presidential seat and the sale of his stocks. On 11 February 2000 Greek business magnate Evangelos Mytilineos bought the stocks of Theodoridis for a reported 1.18 billion Greek drachmas. On 27 January 2003, two days after a 3–1 away defeat of Iraklis against OFI, Mytilineos gave a press conference in which he announced his withdrawal from Iraklis' affairs, due to his disgust with the establishment of Greek football. Shortly afterwards the ownership of the club was passed to businessman Giorgos Spanoudakis for 1 euro and until 2006 the club had accumulated a debt of 8 million euros, partly because Mytilineos did not pay the taxes for the players' contracts and partly due to Spanoudakis handling of the club's affairs. After a takeover of the club, in 2005, by businessman Dimitris Khoulis failed, Spanoudakis continued having the ownership of Iraklis. In 2007 Spanoudakis declared the club's inability to repay its debts to the players and tried to hand Iraklis' stocks to Cypriot businessman Pheevos Morides. After the latter failed to fulfill his promises the deal was cancelled. Greek singer Antonis Remos, a prominent supporter of Iraklis, expressed his interest to undertake the club's fortunes, but he moved back when Spanoudakis asked €500,000 to pass the club's ownership.
On 10 July 2007 Iraklis' administration building was set on fire by supporters in an attempt to express their discontent for the cancellation of the club's takeover from Antonis Remos. A few days later a deal was reached and Remos took over Iraklis. In the summer of 2010, Ioannis Takis took charge as the new chairman.

Summers 2010 and 2011 authorisation issues and reactions 
On 1 June 2010, the club was denied a license to compete in next season's Greek Super League. That summer, Iraklis's fans rallied in Thessaloniki for more than 10 days. Also there were 2 rallies in Athens and other important places in Greece like Malgara and Tempi. Finally, on 25 June, Iraklis received permission to play in Greek Super League for the 2010–11 season.

On 4 May 2011, Iraklis were relegated to Football League (Greece) after failing to obtain a license to participate in 2011–12 Super League. On 19 May 2011, the Disciplinary Committee of the competition found Iraklis guilty of forgery during the winter transfer window. Therefore, the club was automatically placed in the last position. That is a unique case as Iraklis have never finished in a relegation spot but have been relegated twice. On 26 September, however, the Professional Sports Committee stripped Iraklis from its professional licence and demoted it to Delta Ethniki. The team competed in Delta Ethniki under the ownership of G.S. Iraklis Thessaloniki, until the G.S. Irakli's General Assembly decided to disband it in favour of a merging deal with Pontioi Katerini to form AEP Iraklis F.C. in 2012.

The Club is named AEP Iraklis (2012–2014)
Ιn August 2012, AEP Iraklis was incorporated as AEP Iraklis 2012 FC. The new merged club has no legal connection to the original Iraklis Thessaloniki F.C., but is essentially considered as a direct continuation of it. Therefore, G.S. Iraklis Thessaloniki has no shares of the new company, but instead still holds the 10% of the bankrupt original Iraklis FC company, which remains to be dissolved. Currently, MAE Pontioi Katerini own 10% of the new merged club, as required by the Greek sports law, the club's chairman Theodoros Papadopoulos and team fans own the rest, with the chairman possessing a relative majority.

Spyros Papathanasakis era (2014–2018)
In the summer of 2014 and after several months of negotiations Spyros Papathanasakis became the new major shareholder of the club holds the 90% of shares. The same year the company was once again renamed in PAE Iraklis 1908. In 2014–15, Iraklis promoted easily from the second division (Football League) to the Super League (first tier) after finishing in the first place during the regular season and second in the playoffs only behind AEK FC. The next season Iraklis finished in the 12th position to secure Super League status for the next season.
Two years later, despite successfully retaining Super League status once again by finishing 12th the team was again relegated to gamma ethniki (third tier) while the financial situation of the club was again under severe deterioration. This urged Papathanasakis, on 7 September 2017, to declare Iraklis' inability to satisfy financial obligations, causing the club to be disbanded for the second time in five years. Papathanasakis stepped down as owner and chairman of Iraklis FC. For this reason, a brand new committee with Nikos Vafeiadis as its chairman was made by Iraklis's Legends and fans to save the club. 
Despite starting the 2017–18 season with only 14 players Vafeiadis and the rest of the brand new committee brought lots of players who quickly helped Iraklis to climb the rankings and play high quality football during their first season back in Gamma Ethniki since 2011–12. After an amazing season, despite being an outsider Iraklis finished top of the table in group 2. This obtained the club a Play-offs place. In the Play-offs Iraklis managed to finish in the 1st place and gain promotion to Football League (2nd tier).

Tom Papadopoulos era (2018–2019)
In the summer, negotiations began on the purchase of the football section of Iraklis Thessaloniki by the Greek–American businessman Tom Papadopoulos, who is involved in the processing and marketing of marble in the United States of America. On 27 September 2018, Professional Sports Committee of Greece announced that Tom Papadopoulos is the new major shareholder of Iraklis Thessaloniki and today 90% of its shares are its own, since it has already given €300,000 for the share capital of the new company set up a few days ago. The professional club formed through the merger with Pontioi Katerini F.C., which is owned by Tom Papadopoulos, does not currently compete and appears to be insolvent.

Players

Current squad

Personnel

Management

Honours and achievements
Regional
Thessaloniki Championship
Winners (2): 1914, 1915
Macedonia FCA Championship
Winners (5): 1926–27, 1938–39, 1939–40, 1950–51, 1951–52
Runners up (6): 1923–24, 1925–26, 1929–30, 1936–37, 1946–47, 1952–53
Macedonia FCA Championship Fourth Division
Winners (1): 2019–20

National
Super League (First Division)
Runners up (3): 1933–34, 1938–39, 1946–47
Super League 2 (Second Division)
Champions (1): 1980–81
Runners up (1): 2014–15
Gamma Ethniki (Third Division)
Champions (1): 2017–18
Greek Cup
Winners (1): 1975–76
Runners up (4): 1946–47, 1956–57, 1979–80, 1986–87

Iraklis Thessaloniki in European competitions

 Balkans Cup
 Winners (1): 1984–85

Managerial history

Notable former players

Greek Golden Player – UEFA Jubilee Awards
Vasilis Hatzipanagis

Top foreign league goalscorer

Foreigner leading in league appearances

Records and statistics

Records
Biggest win:
14–1 v Enosi Charilaou, 1959–60 Greek Cup
13–0 v Odysseas Kordelio, 1955–56 Greek Cup
Biggest away win:
1–8 v Apollon Krya Vrysi, 1993–94 Greek Cup
Biggest league win:
12–0 v Edessaikos, 1980–81 Beta Ethniki
Biggest top tier win
8–1 v AEK, 1930–31 Panhellenic Championship,
8–1 v Rodos, 1978–79 Alpha Ethniki

League statistics

Positioning in Greek league

1 Demoted to second division due to a match fixing scandal in a cup game against PAOK.  2 Demoted to fourth division (amateur division) because the Professional Sports Committee stripped Iraklis from its professional licence.  3 Demoted to fourth division (amateur division) due to restructuring of national championships and its financial state.

Total league record

Head to head record against city rivals

As of 16 May 2015

Highest attendances

Statistics in Europe
Iraklis' matches in Europe

UEFA club competitions' record

References

External links

Official websites
Official website 
Iraklis at UEFA
Media
Official YouTube channel
News sites
Iraklis on Blue Arena 
Iraklis on Iraklis1908.gr 

Iraklis Thessaloniki F.C.
Iraklis Thessaloniki
Football clubs in Thessaloniki
Association football clubs established in 1908
1908 establishments in the Ottoman Empire
Super League Greece 2 clubs